Ultra Mobile is a mobile virtual network operator (MVNO) that uses the T-Mobile US network. Customers can choose the number of minutes, text messages, or data that can be used via a prepaid mobile phone plan.

History
Ultra Mobile was co-founded by CEO David Glickman, who had previously founded TelePacific Communications, Justice Technology, and Primo Connect.

By 2016, Ultra Mobile products were available in over 25,000 retail stores in the US, including Target and 7-Eleven.

In January 2016, the company acquired rights from Univision Communications to manage the Univision Mobile brand, another T-Mobile mobile virtual network operator which specializes in US SIM-based international calling plans for calls to Latin American countries.  In May 2017, Ultra Mobile announced that it was closing down the Univision Mobile brand and that it would automatically transfer all Univision Mobile subscribers to Ultra Mobile.

In August 2016, Ultra Mobile launched Mint Mobile, formerly Mint SIM, an online-only MVNO specializing in prepaid mobile plans on the T-Mobile cellular network, which provides discounted pricing based on monthly, quarterly, or yearly terms paid in advance.

In 2017, the company had approximately 150 employees in the US, Europe, and Asia, and had focused on hiring millennials.

In November 2019, the corporate spin-off of Mint Mobile from Ultra Mobile was completed and Ryan Reynolds acquired a 20%-25% ownership stake in Mint Mobile. Reynolds and founder Glickman both served on the board of directors for The Michael J. Fox Foundation and Glickman was impressed with how Reynolds handled marketing for Deadpool.

In March 2023, T-Mobile US agreed to acquire Mint Mobile and Ultra Mobile for up to $1.35 billion.

Awards and recognition
In 2015, Ultra Mobile was ranked number 1 in Inc. magazine's list of the 5,000 fastest growing private companies in the United States, with a year-over-year growth rate of 100,849% and revenues of US$118 million in 2014, up from less than a million in 2012.

The company was rated 3.0 or 3.5 out of 5 stars by WhistleOut.

References

Internet service providers of the United States
Mobile virtual network operators
Privately held companies based in California
Telecommunications companies of the United States